A chemigram (from "chemistry" and gramma, Greek for "things written") is an experimental piece of art where an image is made by painting with chemicals on light-sensitive paper (such as photographic paper).

The term Chemigram was coined in the 1950s by Belgian artist Pierre Cordier.

History
Johann Schulze is regarded as the first to obtain a chemigram-like image; in 1725, he produced such a work using opaque paper and a bottle of silver salts. Hippolyte Bayard produced another chemigram-like image during sensitization tests he conducted in 1839. In the 1930s and 1940s, the German Edmund Kesting and the French Maurice Tabard produced pictures by painting with developer and fixer on photographic paper. It is the Belgian artist Pierre Cordier (born 1933), however, who has been most responsible for developing and exploring chemigrams. From his early days, in 1956, he was one of its rare practitioners, and contributed to its development by expanding its technical and esthetic possibilities. He adopted the name chimigramme in French in 1958 (chemigram in English and Dutch, Chemigramm in German, chimigramma in Italian, and quimigrama in Spanish and Portuguese), the most widely accepted designation today. In 1974 Josef H. Neumann advanced the process in his chemograms by incorporating optical elements before applying chemicals.

Process

A chemigram is made by painting with chemicals on photographic paper and lies within the general domain of experimentation in the visual arts. It requires the use of materials from silver halide-based photography (light-sensitive paper, developer, and fixer), but it is not a photograph. Like the photogram, the chemigram is made without a camera, yet it is created in full light instead of in the darkness of the darkroom.  For this reason it is not "light that writes" (photo graphein in the Greek) but rather "chemistry that writes".

Chemigrams can be made solely with photo paper, developer, and fixer, with results that will somewhat resemble watercolor. The possibilities can be multiplied by using materials from painting (such as varnish, wax, or oil), These kinds of experiments are akin to those of Paul Klee, Max Ernst, and Antoni Tàpies.

In contrast to chemograms, the first step in chemograms s is to expose images in the darkroom and then process them with chemicals in daylight.  The technique of the first chemigrams was first developed in its origins, beginning in the 30s of the 20th century, in the application of chemicals on black and white photo paper.  This process of chemigramne, also presented by Edmund Kesting in Dresden as "chemical painting" in the 1930s, served a cameraless art.  Likewise, the Chemigramme, works by the Belgian artist Pierre Cordier, coined by him under the French term Chimigramme, are works of art without a camera.

Unlike chemigrams the production process of chemograms consists of two different steps. First an enlarger is used to partly or fully process a photographic image onto photographic paper in the darkroom and thereafter the chemicals are applied in full light.

Notes

References

External links

 "Camera-less photography" from the Victoria and Albert Museum

Photographic techniques